Last of the Summer Wine's fifteenth series aired on BBC1 in 1993. All of the episodes were written by Roy Clarke and produced and directed by Alan J. W. Bell.

Outline
The trio in this series consisted of:

List of episodes
Regular series

Christmas Special (1993)

DVD release
The box set for series fifteen was released by Universal Playback in October 2009, mislabelled as a box set for series 15 & 16.

References

See also

Last of the Summer Wine series
1993 British television seasons